The 2019 Tour of Slovenia is a five-day cycling stage race that was held in Slovenia between 19 and 23 June 2019. The race was the 26th edition of the Tour of Slovenia and the first time it was classified as 2.HC race on the UCI Europe Tour.

After attacking on the climb to Dole on stage 3, Diego Ulissi won the Tour of Slovenia for the second time, with his first overall victory coming in 2011.

Teams

Eighteen teams, which consisted of five UCI WorldTour teams, eight UCI Professional Continental teams, five UCI Continental teams, and one national team, participated in the race. Of the 129 riders who began the race, only 109 riders finished the race.

UCI WorldTeams

 
 
 
 
 

UCI Professional Continental Teams

 
 
 
 
 
 
 
 

UCI Continental Teams

 
 
 
 
 

National Teams

 Slovenia

Route

Stages

Stage 1

19 June 2019 — Ljubljana to Rogaška Slatina,

Stage 2
20 June 2019 — Maribor to Celje,

Stage 3
21 June 2019 — Žalec to Idrija,

Stage 4
22 June 2019 — Nova Gorica to Ajdovščina,

Stage 5

23 June 2019 — Trebnje to Novo Mesto,

Classification leadership table

Final classification standings

General classification

Points classification

Mountains classification

Young rider classification

Teams classification

References

External links

2019
2019 UCI Europe Tour
2019 in Slovenian sport
June 2019 sports events in Europe